This is a list of listed buildings in Langeland Municipality, Denmark.

Listed buildings

5900 Rudkøbing

5932 Humble

5935 Bagenkop

5943 Strynø

5953 Tranekær

References

External links 

 Danish Agency of Culture

 
Langeland